Whakamoke is a genus of Polynesian shield spiders. It was first described by Gustavo Hormiga and N. Scharff in 2020, and it has only been found in New Zealand.

Species
 it contains seven species:
W. guacamole Hormiga & Scharff, 2020 – New Zealand
W. heru Hormiga & Scharff, 2020 – New Zealand
W. hunahuna Hormiga & Scharff, 2020 – New Zealand
W. orongorongo Hormiga & Scharff, 2020 (type) – New Zealand
W. paoka Hormiga & Scharff, 2020 – New Zealand
W. rakiura Hormiga & Scharff, 2020 – New Zealand
W. tarakina Hormiga & Scharff, 2020 – New Zealand

See also
 List of Malkaridae species

References

Malkaridae genera
Spiders of New Zealand